
This is a list of postal codes in Canada where the first letter is H. Postal codes beginning with H are located within the Canadian province of Quebec, except for H0H. Only the first three characters are listed, corresponding to the Forward Sortation Area.

Canada Post provides a free postal code look-up tool on its website, via its mobile apps for such smartphones as the iPhone and BlackBerry,  and sells hard-copy directories and CD-ROMs. Many vendors also sell validation tools, which allow customers to properly match addresses and postal codes. Hard-copy directories can also be consulted in all post offices, and some libraries.

Metropolitan Montreal - 123 FSAs
Notes: No postal codes yet exist that start with H6*. H0M is an arbitrary FSA assignment, over 100 km from the centre of Montreal, as is H0H (representing the North Pole).

Most populated FSAs
H1G, 49,657
H1E, 43,551
H7N, 37,672
H7W, 36,226
H1Z, 35,357

Least populated FSAs
H4Z, 5
H5A, 5
H5B, 5
H4T, 10
H3B, 56

References

Communications in Quebec
H
Dollard-des-Ormeaux
Dorval
Kirkland, Quebec
Laval, Quebec
Montreal
Pointe-Claire
Postal codes H